Avtandil Nikolozis dze Gogoberidze (3 August 1922, Sukhumi – 20 November 1980, Tbilisi), nicknamed "Basa", was a Soviet and Georgian football player. He was a Grigory Fedotov club member. His son Tengiz Gogoberidze played one game in the Soviet Top League for FC Dinamo Tbilisi.

International career
Gogoberidze made his debut for USSR on 15 July 1952 in the 1952 Olympics game against Bulgaria.

References

External links

 Avtandil Gogoberidze at rusteam.permian.ru 

1922 births
1980 deaths
Sportspeople from Sukhumi
Footballers from Abkhazia
Soviet footballers
Soviet Union international footballers
Footballers from Georgia (country)
Soviet football managers
Soviet Top League players
FC Dinamo Sukhumi players
FC Dinamo Tbilisi players
FC Dinamo Tbilisi managers
Footballers at the 1952 Summer Olympics
Olympic footballers of the Soviet Union
Honoured Masters of Sport of the USSR
Recipients of the Order of the Red Banner of Labour
Association football forwards